The 1934 FIFA World Cup was the second edition of the FIFA World Cup, the quadrennial international football championship for senior men's national teams. It took place in Italy from 27 May to 10 June 1934.

The 1934 World Cup was the first in which teams had to qualify to take part. Thirty-two nations entered the competition; 16 teams would qualify for the final tournament. Reigning champions Uruguay boycotted the tournament as only four European teams had accepted their invitation to the 1930 tournament. Italy beat Czechoslovakia 2–1 to become the second World Cup champions and the first European winners.

The 1934 World Cup was marred by being a high-profile instance of a sporting event being used for overt political gain. In particular, Benito Mussolini was keen to use this World Cup as a means of promoting fascism. Although some historians and sports journalists have made accusations of corruption and meddling by Mussolini to influence the competition to the benefit of Italy, Italy has always claimed to have deserved victory in the competition and the successful national team, considered to be one of the best in the country's history, emerged victorious also in the Olympic football tournament of 1936 hosted by Germany and in the 1938 World Cup hosted by France.

The Federale 102 ball, which was manufactured in Italy, was the match ball provided for the 1934 World Cup.

Host selection

After a lengthy decision-making process in which FIFA's executive committee met eight times, Italy was chosen as the host nation at a meeting in Stockholm on 9 October 1932. The decision was taken by the executive committee without a ballot of members. The Italian bid was chosen in preference to one from Sweden; the Italian government assigned a budget of Lire 3.5 million to the tournament.

Qualification and participants

36 countries applied to enter the tournament, so qualifying matches were required to thin the field to 16. Even so, there were several notable absentees. Reigning World Cup holders Uruguay declined to participate, in protest at the refusal of several European countries to travel to South America for the previous World Cup, which Uruguay had hosted in 1930. As a result, the 1934 World Cup is the only one in which the reigning champions did not participate. The British Home Nations, in a period of self-imposed exile from FIFA, also refused to participate, even though FIFA had offered England and Scotland direct entry to the tournament without qualification. Football Association committee member Charles Sutcliffe called the tournament "a joke" and claimed that "the national associations of England, Scotland, Wales and Ireland have quite enough to do in their own International Championship which seems to me a far better World Championship than the one to be staged in Rome".

Despite their role as hosts, Italy were still required to qualify, the only time the host needed to do so. The qualifying matches were arranged on a geographical basis. Withdrawals by Chile and Peru meant Argentina and Brazil qualified without playing a single match.

Twelve of the 16 places were allocated to Europe, three to the Americas, and one to Africa or Asia (including Turkey). Only 10 of the 32 entrants, and four of the 16 qualified teams (Brazil, Argentina, United States and Egypt, the first African team to qualify for a World Cup finals tournament), were from outside Europe. The last place in the finals was contested between the United States and Mexico only three days before the start of the tournament in a one-off match in Rome, which the United States won.

List of qualified teams

The following 16 teams qualified for the final tournament.

 (hosts)

10 of these teams made their first World Cup appearance. This included 9 of the 12 European teams (Italy, Germany, Spain, the Netherlands, Hungary, Czechoslovakia, Sweden, Austria, and Switzerland) as well as Egypt. Egypt was the first team from Africa in the finals and would not qualify again until the next time the competition was held in Italy, in 1990.

Venues
The number of supporters travelling from other countries was higher than at any previous football tournament, including 7,000 from the Netherlands and 10,000 each from Austria and Switzerland.

Format
The group stage used in the first World Cup was discarded in favour of a straight knockout tournament. If a match was tied after ninety minutes, then thirty minutes of extra time were played. If the score was still tied after extra time, the match was replayed the next day.

The eight seeded teams – Argentina, Brazil, Germany, Italy, the Netherlands, Austria, Czechoslovakia and Hungary – were kept apart in the first round.

Summary

All eight first-round matches kicked off at the same time. Hosts and favourites Italy won handsomely, defeating the USA 7–1; The New York Times correspondent wrote that "only the fine goal-tending of Julius Hjulian of Chicago kept the score as low as it was".

Internal disputes meant Argentina's squad for the tournament did not contain a single member of the team which had reached the final in 1930. In the end, La Albiceleste would partake with an amateur squad. Against Sweden in Bologna, Argentina twice took the lead, but two goals by Sven Jonasson and a winner by Knut Kroon gave Sweden a 3–2 victory. Fellow South Americans Brazil also suffered an early exit. Spain beat them comfortably; 3–1 the final score.

For the only time in World Cup history, the last eight consisted entirely of European teams – Austria, Czechoslovakia, Germany, Hungary, Italy, Spain, Sweden, and Switzerland. All four non-European teams who made the journey to Italy were eliminated after one match.

In the quarter-finals, the first replayed match in World Cup history took place, when Italy and Spain drew 1–1 after extra time. The match was played in a highly aggressive manner with several players of both sides injured: rough play injured the Spanish goalkeeper Ricardo Zamora in the first match, leaving him unable to participate in the replay, while on the other side rough play by Spaniards broke the leg of the Italian Mario Pizziolo who would not play in the national team again. Italy won the replay 1–0; their play so physical that at least three Spaniards had to depart the field with injuries. Italy then went on to beat Austria in the semi-finals by the same score. Meanwhile, Czechoslovakia secured their place in the final by beating Germany 3–1.

The Stadium of the National Fascist Party was the venue for the final. With 80 minutes played, the Czechoslovaks led 1–0. The Italians managed to score before the final whistle and then added another goal in extra time to be crowned World Cup winners.

Throughout the years, several sources have reported that the tournament was marred by bribery and corruption, and could have been influenced by Italian dictator Benito Mussolini, who used the tournament as a propaganda tool for fascism. According to these accusations, Mussolini personally selected referees for the matches where the Italy national team were playing, while the Italian government meddled in FIFA's organisation of events, re-organizing the logistics of the matches to further promote fascism. Nonetheless, Italy also won the following edition of the World Cup (held in France) as well as the Olympic football tournament in 1936.

Squads
For a list of all squads that appeared in the final tournament, see 1934 FIFA World Cup squads.

Final tournament

Bracket

Round of 16

Quarter-finals

Replay

Semi-finals

Third place play-off

Final

Goalscorers

With five goals, Oldřich Nejedlý was the top scorer in the tournament. In total, 70 goals were scored by 45 players, with none of them credited as an own goal.

5 goals

  Oldřich Nejedlý

4 goals

  Edmund Conen
  Angelo Schiavio

3 goals

  Raimundo Orsi
  Leopold Kielholz

2 goals

  Johann Horvath
  Bernard Voorhoof
  Antonín Puč
  Abdulrahman Fawzi
  Karl Hohmann
  Ernst Lehner
  Géza Toldi
  Giovanni Ferrari
  Giuseppe Meazza
  José Iraragorri
  Sven Jonasson

1 goal

  Ernesto Belis
  Alberto Galateo
  Josef Bican
  Anton Schall
  Karl Sesta
  Matthias Sindelar
  Karl Zischek
  Leônidas
  Jiří Sobotka
  František Svoboda
  Jean Nicolas
  Georges Verriest
  Stanislaus Kobierski
  Rudolf Noack
  Otto Siffling
  György Sárosi
  Pál Teleki
  Jenő Vincze
  Enrique Guaita
  Kick Smit
  Leen Vente
  Ștefan Dobay
  Isidro Lángara
  Luis Regueiro
  Gösta Dunker
  Knut Kroon
  André Abegglen
  Willy Jäggi
  Aldo Donelli

FIFA retrospective ranking 
In 1986, FIFA published a report that ranked all teams in each World Cup up to and including 1986, based on progress in the competition, overall results and quality of the opposition (not counting replay results). The rankings for the 1934 tournament were as follows:

References

Bibliography

External links

 1934 FIFA World Cup at FIFA.com
 1934 FIFA World Cup at RSSSF.com

 
FIFA World Cup tournaments
International association football competitions hosted by Italy
World
World
FIFA World Cup
FIFA World Cup